Daniil Fedorovych Yermolov (born 3 December 2000) is a Ukrainian professional footballer who plays as a goalkeeper for Ukrainian club Kremin Kremenchuk.

References

External links
 
 
 

2000 births
Living people
People from Bashtanka
Ukrainian footballers
Association football goalkeepers
FC Stal Kamianske players
FC Volyn Lutsk players
FC Nyva Ternopil players
FC Kremin Kremenchuk players
FC Metalist Kharkiv players
Ukrainian Premier League players
Ukrainian First League players
Ukrainian Second League players
Sportspeople from Mykolaiv Oblast